Sally Conway Kilbane (born November 11, 1942) is a former Republican member of the Ohio House of Representatives, representing the 16th District from 1999 to 2006.

References

External links
Profile on the Ohio Ladies' Gallery website

Republican Party members of the Ohio House of Representatives
Living people
Women state legislators in Ohio
1942 births
21st-century American politicians
21st-century American women politicians